Darya Starostina (born 19 October 1982) is a Kazakhstani cross-country skier. She competed at the 2002 Winter Olympics and the 2006 Winter Olympics.

References

External links
 

1982 births
Living people
Kazakhstani female cross-country skiers
Olympic cross-country skiers of Kazakhstan
Cross-country skiers at the 2002 Winter Olympics
Cross-country skiers at the 2006 Winter Olympics
Sportspeople from Astana
Asian Games medalists in cross-country skiing
Cross-country skiers at the 1999 Asian Winter Games
Cross-country skiers at the 2003 Asian Winter Games
Asian Games gold medalists for Kazakhstan
Medalists at the 2003 Asian Winter Games
21st-century Kazakhstani women